Alla Kudryavtseva and Anastasia Rodionova were the defending champions, but Rodionova decided not to participate.
Kudryavtseva played alongside Olga Govortsova, but lost in the first round to Raquel Kops-Jones and Abigail Spears.

4th seeds Barbora Záhlavová-Strýcová and Klára Zakopalová won the title beating Dominika Cibulková and Flavia Pennetta 1–6, 6–4, [10–7] in the final.

Seeds

Draw

Draw

References
 Main Draw

UNICEF Open - Doubles
2011 - Women's Doubles